Carnival of Sound is the last studio album by the American rock duo Jan and Dean. Though recorded sporadically from 1966 to 1968, it was not released until 2010. Even though it is credited as a Jan and Dean record, it is actually more of a Jan Berry solo effort. Jan died in 2004. The album consists mostly of original material, with a few covers of songs by artists such as The Five Satins and The Coasters. The album is notable for having a more psychedelic sound than other Jan and Dean records.

Background
Sessions for a new Jan and Dean album began in March 1966, with a few tracks completed before Jan Berry's debilitating car accident the following month. Sessions continued sporadically until December 1968 as Berry slowly recovered. The project was also significantly over budget. The album was deemed complete in 1969 but was never released, while collectors circulated unofficial bootleg versions. The album's disappearance prevented a possible psychedelic comeback for Jan and Dean, and their working relationship as a duo soon ended.

Rhino Handmade Records released the first official version of the album as a limited-edition mono vinyl record in November 2009, followed by a wider release on compact disc in February 2010. Included were tracks intended for the original album in 1968 plus 15 bonus tracks from the same sessions. Producer Andrew Sandoval contributed extensive liner notes. AllMusic compared the album to Brian Wilson's Smile, calling it "just as tantalizing a 'lost' artifact of the psychedelic '60s" and that Jan Berry had become "far more self-consciously ambitious" than on previous Jan and Dean records.

While presented as a Jan and Dean album, Jan Berry (even though he wrote and produced the material) only played and sang on a few songs due to complications from his car accident. Dean Torrence, who by that time had become disillusioned with the duo's prospects, only appears on one song. Glen Campbell made some contributions to the sessions, and singer Tom Bahler performed lead vocals on several songs.

Track listing

Original release 
 "Girl, You're Blowing My Mind" (Jan Berry, Steve Gaines, Paul Freese)
 "Mulholland" (Jan Berry, Roger Christian)
 "Fan Tan" (Jan Berry, Jill Gibson, Don Altfeld)
 "Carnival of Sound" (Jan Berry, Roger Christian, David Weiss)
 "Laurel and Hardy" (Jan Berry, Roger Christian)
 "I Know My Mind" (Jan Berry, Roger Christian)
 "Love and Hate" (Jan Berry, Jill Gibson, Jan Hirsch)
 "Tijuana" (Jan Berry, Roger Christian, Don Altfeld)
 "Hawaii" (Jan Berry, Jill Gibson)
 "Louisiana Man" (Doug Kershaw)
 "Stay" (Maurice Williams)
 "Only a Boy" (Jan Berry, Don Altfeld, Fred Wieder)
 "In the Still of the Night" (Fred Parris)
 "Yakety Yak" (Jerry Leiber, Mike Stoller)

Additional tracks 
 "Don't Drop It" — (Backing Track) (Unknown)
 "Girl, You're Blowing My Mind" — (Stereo Mix) (Jan Berry, Steve Gaines, Paul Freese)
 "Mulholland" — (Stereo Mix) (Jan Berry, Roger Christian)
 "Fan Tan" — (Stereo Mix) (Jan Berry, Jill Gibson, Don Altfeld)
 "Carnival of Sound" — (Stereo Mix) (Jan Berry, Roger Christian, David Weiss)
 "I Know My Mind" — (Stereo Mix) (Jan Berry, Roger Christian)
 "Love and Hate" — (Stereo Mix) (Jan Berry, Jill Gibson, Jan Hirsch)
 "Tijuana" — (Stereo Mix) (Jan Berry, Don Altfeld, Roger Christian)
 "Hawaii" — (Stereo Mix) (Jan Berry, Jill Gibson)
 "Louisiana Man" — (Stereo Mix) (Doug Kershaw)
 "Stay" — (Stereo Mix) (Maurice Williams)
 "In the Still of the Night" — (Stereo Mix) (Fred Parris)
 "Girl, You're Blowing My Mind" — (Jan's Final Mix) (Jan Berry, Steve Gaines, Paul Freese)
 "Laurel and Hardy" — (Jan's Demo) (Jan Berry, Roger Christian)
 "Girl, You're Blowing My Mind" — (Alternate Backing Track) (Jan Berry, Steve Gaines, Paul Freese)

References

External links 
 Official website

2010 albums
Jan and Dean albums
Rhino Handmade albums
Albums recorded at Gold Star Studios
Albums recorded at United Western Recorders
Albums recorded at Wally Heider Studios
Albums produced by Andrew Sandoval